Vytautas Janušaitis (born October 13, 1981 in Kaunas, Lithuania) is an Olympic medley swimmer from Lithuania, who represented his home country at the 2004, 2008 and 2012 Summer Olympics.

He participated at every edition of the European Short Course Championships from 2004 to 2010.

He swam at the 2003 World University Games.

References

1981 births
Living people
Lithuanian male medley swimmers
Swimmers at the 2004 Summer Olympics
Swimmers at the 2008 Summer Olympics
Swimmers at the 2012 Summer Olympics
Olympic swimmers of Lithuania
European Aquatics Championships medalists in swimming
Universiade medalists in swimming
Universiade silver medalists for Lithuania
Sportspeople from Kaunas
Medalists at the 2005 Summer Universiade